Incești may refer to several villages in Romania:

 Incești, a village in Avram Iancu Commune, Alba County
 Incești, a village in Poșaga Commune, Alba County
 Incești, a village in Ceica Commune, Bihor County